Stefan Tripković (born 27 July 1993) is a Serbian football striker.

Career
He had solid performances, playing for youth categories of Sloga Kraljevo, often has been declared as a Man of the match, had one league appearance, and one league cup match for first team. Later, he left to his hometown, Trstenik, in club with same name, but within the industry of Prva Petoletka. At the beginning of 2013, he was playing for Widnau, Swiss lower-ranked club, where he scored 3 goals on 4 matches. Then he moved to Tallinna Kalev and, he quickly became a favorite of fans of that club. He scored 7 goals on 18 appearances.

In February 2014, he returned to Serbia and signed with Rad.

He was a member of selections under 16 and 18 years old.

References

External links
 
 Stefan Tripkovic at sport.me
 Stefan Tripkovic  Player Profile au.eurosport.com
 

1993 births
Living people
People from Trstenik, Serbia
Association football forwards
Serbian footballers
Serbian expatriate footballers
Expatriate footballers in Estonia
Meistriliiga players
JK Tallinna Kalev players
FK Sloga Kraljevo players
FK Rad players
FK Sloga Petrovac na Mlavi players
FK BSK Borča players
FK Javor Ivanjica players
Serbian First League players
Serbian SuperLiga players
Serbian expatriate sportspeople in Estonia